Marina Faust (born 1950) is an Austrian artist and photographer.

Life and work

Marina Faust began working at the age of eighteen as a photographer in Vienna. Between 1974 and 1975 she collaborated with Magnum Photos. In the 1980s, she exhibited her work at Galerie Agathe Gaillard in Paris, France. 

Faust has collaborated as a photographer with Maison Martin Margiela since 1990.

In 1995, Faust began working with other media, including collages, videos and objects. She taught at the École nationale supérieure des Beaux-Arts in 2000-2001. Her group of traveling chairs, first shown at Song Song, in Vienna in 2007, is part of the collection of Museum für angewandte Kunst Wien and is on display at the Contemporary Art Tower, Vienna. Her photo series are regularly published in French art magazine Frog.

In October 2012, her collaboration with Franz West, "Talk without Words (Christopher Wool)", was exhibited at Gagosian Gallery, London.

References

1950 births
Living people
20th-century Austrian women artists
21st-century Austrian women artists
20th-century women photographers
Austrian photographers
Austrian women photographers
Austrian contemporary artists